Tang Talkh-e Pagin (also Romanized as Tang Talkh-e Pagīn and Tang-e Talkh-e Pegīn) is a village in Soltanabad Rural District, in the Central District of Ramhormoz County, Khuzestan Province, Iran. At the 2006 census, its population was 92, in 17 families.

References 

Populated places in Ramhormoz County